USRC Windom (later Comanche) was a revenue cutter of the United States Revenue Cutter Service and United States Coast Guard that served from 1896 to 1930. She was named for William Windom, the 33rd and 39th United States Secretary of the Treasury. She served during the Spanish–American War with the United States Navy. Windom was recommissioned as USCGC Comanche in 1915 and again served with the Navy as USS Comanche during World War I.

Construction

Service history

Revenue cutter
Windom was completed in 1896 at the Iowa Iron Works in Dubuque, Iowa and was accepted by the Treasury Department on 11 May 1896. Partially incomplete, she was moved from Dubuque—via Cairo, Illinois, and New Orleans, Louisiana—to Baltimore, Maryland, where she was completed and placed in commission on 30 June 1896. For the next 17 months, she operated out of Baltimore making an annual winter cruise of the fishing grounds between the Virginia Capes and Cape Hatteras.

Spanish–American War
In March 1898, with war against Spain looming just over the horizon, President William McKinley began the process of preparing for the fight. On the 24th, he issued the executive order instructing the Revenue Cutter Service to cooperate with the Navy for the duration of the crisis. Two days later, she received orders to report at Norfolk, Virginia, and there she found herself on 25 April when Congress passed the resolution recognizing that a state of war existed between the United States and Spain.

Five days later, Windom departed Hampton Roads on her way to the blockade off Cuba. She stopped at Key West, Florida, for four days and arrived off the Cuban coast on 8 May. She patrolled the southern coast of Cuba near Cienfuegos until the 13th. During that time, she cut the Cienfuegos cable, the Spanish colonial government's only link with the outside world; and, on 12 May, she helped to cover the withdrawal of a Navy boat expedition. At a critical point in that action, the cutter closed the enemy shore and silenced the Spanish battery and briefly dispersed their infantry allowing the harassed boats to reach safety. The following day, she withdrew from the area to return to Key West—probably for fuel and provisions. She again got underway for the combat zone on 27 May and took up station off Havana on the 28th. For the remainder of the Spanish–American War, Windom participated in the blockade of Havana, returning to Key West on two occasions—once during the last two weeks of June and again during the first week in August.

Return to the revenue service 
Hostilities ended on 13 August; Windom reverted to Treasury Department control on the 17th; and she returned to Norfolk on the 22nd. She remained there until 3 October at which time she headed for New York City where she transferred most of her armament to Gresham before resuming duty at Baltimore with the Revenue Cutter Service on the 13th. From the fall of 1898 to the summer of 1906, Windom operated out of Baltimore, cruising the waters of the Chesapeake Bay and occasionally venturing out into the Atlantic in the vicinity of the Virginia Capes. On 13 July 1906, the cutter departed Arundel Cove, Maryland, to sail—via Key West, and Mobile, Alabama—to her new base of operations, Galveston, Texas. She arrived there on 6 August and began duty patrolling the gulf coast of the United States. That assignment lasted for five years.

On 1 August 1911, she left Galveston to return to Arundel Cove. She arrived at the station on the shores of the Chesapeake on 1 September and was placed out of commission on the 12th. Her retirement, however, was only a brief one, for she returned to full commission on 1 November. She served at Washington, D.C., from mid-November 1911 until early May 1912. On 7 May, she headed back to the Gulf of Mexico. Initially, she assisted in flood relief at New Orleans; but, in June, she resumed her coastal patrols out of Galveston. She cruised the entire gulf coast from Texas to Key West over the next 18 months. After war broke out in Europe in August 1914, the cutter took on the added responsibility of enforcing America's neutrality laws.

In November 1914, Windom headed back to Arundel Cove to be decommissioned again. She arrived at the depot on 3 December but made a short voyage to Washington before going out of service. She returned to Arundel Cove on 13 January 1915; and, on the 15th, she was placed out of commission. On 13 December 1915, near the end of a year of inactivity, Windom was renamed Comanche. Less than a month later, on 8 January 1916, the cutter went back into service under her new name. On 19 January, she departed the Chesapeake Bay area to return to her old patrol area in the Gulf of Mexico. She arrived at Galveston on 2 February and resumed her old routine.

World War I
The United States' declaration of war on the Central Powers once again brought the cutter under Navy Department control on 6 April 1917. Comanche continued to patrol the gulf coast even in naval service. Her second period of service with the Navy lasted over two years until 28 August 1919 at which time she was returned to the jurisdiction of the Treasury Department.

Revenue service again
She continued her patrols of the gulf for another seven months and then headed for Key West where she was decommissioned on 17 April 1920 for repairs. Recommissioned in July, the ship relieved cutter  at Mobile and rejoined the Gulf Division. Serving successively at Mobile, Key West, and Galveston, she patrolled coastal waters constantly until June 1930. During that period, she left the Gulf of Mexico only once, in 1923, for repairs at Baltimore and Norfolk. On 2 June 1930, she was detached from the Gulf Division and was ordered back to Arundel Cove.

Disposal
She arrived at her destination on 1 July and was placed out of commission on 31 July 1930. She was sold to Weiss Motor Lines, of Baltimore, on 13 November 1930 for 4,501.

Notes

Citations

References used

External links
 

Ships built in Iowa
1896 ships
Spanish–American War naval ships of the United States
World War I patrol vessels of the United States